Kate Shierlaw (born 28 February 1989) is an Australian rules footballer who plays for North Melbourne in the AFL Women's competition (AFLW). She was recruited by Carlton as a rookie player prior to the club's inaugural AFLW season in 2017. She made her debut in round 2, 2017, in a match against  at Ikon Park. Shierlaw did not miss a game from then on, finishing with six matches played in 2017. She was delisted by Carlton at the end of the 2018 season.

On 9 August 2019, St Kilda announced they had contracted Shierlaw for the 2020 season; they named her co-captain of the club in January 2020. It was revealed Shierlaw had signed on with the Saints for one more year on 30 June 2021, tying her to the club until the end of the 2021/2022 season.

In March 2023, Shierlaw was traded to North Melbourne as part of a three-club deal.

References

External links

Living people
1989 births
Carlton Football Club (AFLW) players
Australian rules footballers from South Australia
Sportswomen from South Australia
Lesbian sportswomen
Australian LGBT sportspeople
LGBT players of Australian rules football
Melbourne University Football Club (VFLW) players
Darebin Falcons players
St Kilda Football Club (AFLW) players